This is a list of records and statistics of the FIFA U-17 World Cup.

Debut of national teams

Overall team records
In this ranking 3 points are awarded for a win, 1 for a draw and 0 for a loss. As per statistical convention in football, matches decided in extra time are counted as wins and losses, while matches decided by penalty shoot-outs are counted as draws. Teams are ranked by total points, then by goal difference, then by goals scored.

Teams that have finished in the top four

1 = includes results representing Soviet Union
2 = includes results representing West Germany

Comprehensive team results by tournament

Legend
 — Champions
 — Runners-up
 — Third place
 — Fourth place
QF — Quarterfinals (1985-2005: first group stage, and since 2007: second group stage; final 8)
R2 — Round 2 (since 2007: knockout round of 16)
R1 — Round 1
 — Did not qualify
 — Did not enter / Withdrew
 — Disqualified
 — Country did not exist or national team was inactive
 — Hosts
 q — Qualified for upcoming tournament

For each tournament, the flag of the host country and the number of teams in each finals tournament (in brackets) are shown.

 Note 1: Original hosts Peru were stripped of the right to host the 2019 event in February 2019.

Results of defending champions

Results of host nations

Results by confederation

AFC

CAF

CONCACAF

CONMEBOL

OFC

UEFA

Awards

Team: tournament position

 Most championships 5;  (1985, 1993, 2007, 2013, 2015)
 Most finishes in the top two 8;  (1985, 1987, 1993, 2001, 2007, 2009, 2013, 2015)
 Most finishes in the top three 8;  (1985, 1987, 1993, 2001, 2007, 2009, 2013, 2015),  (1985, 1995, 1997, 1999, 2003, 2005, 2017, 2019)
 Most second-place finishes 4;  (1991, 2003, 2007, 2017)
 Most third-place finishes 3;  (1991, 1995, 2003)
 Most 3rd-4th-place finishes 5;  (1991, 1995, 2001, 2003, 2013)

Consecutive
 Most consecutive championships 2;  (1997–1999),  (2013–2015)
 Most consecutive finishes in the top two 4;  (1991–1997)
 Most consecutive finishes in the top three 5;  (1991–1999) 
 Most consecutive finishes in the top four 5;  (1991–1999)
 Most consecutive finals tournaments 14;  (1985–2011)
 Most consecutive second-place finishes no country has finished 2nd in two consecutive tournaments
 Most consecutive third-place finishes no country has finished 3rd in two consecutive tournaments
 Most consecutive fourth-place finishes no country has finished 4th in two consecutive tournaments
 Most consecutive 3rd-4th-place finishes 2;  (2001–2003)

Gaps
 Longest gap between successive titles 16 years;  (2003–2019)
 Longest gap between successive appearances in the top two 14 years;  (2005–2019)
 Longest gap between successive appearances in the top three 22 years;  (1985–2007)
 Longest gap between successive appearances in the top four 18 years;  (2005–2019)

Host team
 Best finish by a host team Champions;  (2011),  (2019)
 Worst finish by a host team Group stage;  (1987),  (2001),  (2017)

Defending champion
 Best finish by defending champion Champion;  (1999),  (2015)
 Worst finish by defending champion Did not qualify;  (1989),  (1991),  (2003),  (2007),  (2011),  (2017),  (2019)
 Worst finish by defending champion who participates in the next tournament Quarter-finals;  (2001)

Debuting teams
 Best finish by a debuting team Champions;  (1985),  (1987),  (2009)

Other
 Most finishes in the top two, never become champions 4;  (1991, 2003, 2007, 2017)
 Most finishes in the top four, never become champions 6;  (1991, 1997, 2003, 2007, 2009, 2017)
 Most appearances, never become champions 15;  (all except 2013)
 Most finishes in the top four, never finish in the top two 5;  (1991, 1995, 2001, 2003, 2013)
 Most appearances, never finish in the top two 15;  (all except 2013)
 Most appearances, never finish in the top four 10;  (1985, 1995, 1997, 2001, 2003, 2005, 2007, 2009, 2015, 2017)

All time
 Most appearances in the group stage 17;  (every tournament except 1993),  (every tournament except 2013)
 Most progression from the group stage 15;  (every tournament except 1987 and 2009)
 Most consecutive appearances, progressing from the group stage 7;  (1995–2007)
 Most appearances, never progressing from the group stage 7;  (1987, 1989, 1993, 1995, 2011, 2013)

Host team
 Host teams eliminated in the group stage  (1987),  (1991),  (1999),  (2001),  (2003),  (2005),  (2007),  (2013),  (2017)

Teams: matches played and goals scored

All time
 Most matches played 89; 
 Most wins 59; 
 Most losses 32; 
 Most draws 14; 
 Most goals scored 192; 
 Most goals conceded 102; 
 Highest goal difference +119; 
 Lowest goal difference –69; 
 Most played final 2 times;  vs  (1995, 1997),  vs  (2005, 2019)

In one tournament
 Most goals scored 26;  (2013)
 Most goals scored, champions 26;  (2013)
 Most goals scored, hosts 21;  (2011)
 Fewest goals scored, champions 8;  (1989),  (1991),  (1999)

Goalscoring

Individual
 Most goals scored in a tournament 10; Victor Osimhen (2015)
 Most goals scored in a match 4; David (vs ) (1997), Carlos Hidalgo (vs ) (2003), Souleymane Coulibaly (vs ) (2011),  Kelechi Iheanacho (vs ) (2013)
 Most goals scored in one final 2; Phil Foden, Sergio Gomez (2017)
 Fastest goal in a final 3rd minute; Wilson Oruma (vs ) (1993)
 Latest goal from kickoff in a final 93rd minute; Lázaro (vs ) (2019)

Team
 Most goals scored in a match, both teams 13;  13–0  (1997)
 Most goals scored in a final, one team 5;  (2017)
 Most goals scored in a final, both teams 7;  5–2  (2017)
 Fewest goals scored in a final, both teams 0;  0–0  (1999),  0–0  (2007)
 Biggest margin of victory in a final 3;  (2001),  (2005),  (2013),  (2017)
 Most goals in a tournament, one team 26;  (2013)

Tournament
 Most goals scored in a tournament 183 goals, 2017
 Fewest goals scored in a tournament 77 goals, 1989
 Most goals per match in a tournament 3.52 goals per match, 2017
 Fewest goals per match in a tournament 2.4 goals per match, 1989

Top scoring teams by tournament
Teams listed in bold won the tournament.

Host records
 Best performance by host(s) Champions;  (2011),  (2019)
 Worst performance by host(s) Group stage;  (1987),  (1991),  (1999),  (2001),  (2003),  (2005),  (2007),  (2013),  (2017)
 Had its best performance when hosting
Champions:  (2011),  (2019)
Runners-up:  (1989),  (2009)
Semifinals: none
Quarterfinals:  (1985),  (1995),  (1997)      
Round of 16: none
Group stage:   (1987),  (2001),  (2003),  (2017)

Penalty shootouts
 Most shootouts with 100% record (all won) 2; 

Most wins, penalty shoot-out

See also
 National team appearances in the FIFA U-20 World Cup

References

External links
FIFA.com 
RSSSF archive